The list of Czech films is a list of films made in the Czech lands from 1898 to the present. After 1930 some were with Czech sound, and after 1947 some were in colour. The list is ordered by year of release.

1898–1919 
List of Czech films before 1920

1920s 
List of Czech films of the 1920s

1930s 
List of Czech films of the 1930s

1940s 
List of Czech films of the 1940s

1950s 
List of Czech films of the 1950s

1960s 
List of Czech films of the 1960s

1970s 
List of Czech films of the 1970s

1980s 
List of Czech films of the 1980s

1990s 
List of Czech films of the 1990s

2000s 
List of Czech films of the 2000s

2010s 
List of Czech films of the 2010s

2020s 
List of Czech films of the 2020s

See also 
 List of Slovak films

External links 
 Czech film at the Internet Movie Database